Tuddal is a village in Hjartdal municipality, Norway.

Villages in Vestfold og Telemark
Hjartdal